Nostra may refer to:

Literature
Quo usque tandem abutere, Catilina, patientia nostra? is a Latin phrase from Marcus Tullius Cicero's first speech against Catilina.

Music
Cosa Nostra: Hip Hop is a 2006 hip-hop compilation album by Ivy Queen
Cosa Nostra Never Sleeps is a Johnny Thunders bootleg recorded on June 19, 1983, at Folkets Park, Södertälje
Koza nostra is the tenth studio album from Serbian and former Yugoslav rock band Riblja Čorba
La Coka Nostra is an American hip hop group
West Koastra Nostra is the sixth album by Samoan rap group, Boo-Yaa T.R.I.B.E.

Organizations
Cosa Nostra is a name given to the Sicilian Mafia and the Italian-American Mafia
Europa Nostra, the pan-European Federation for Cultural Heritage, is the representative platform of 250 heritage NGOs active in 45 countries across Europe
Italia Nostra is an Italian not for profit campaigning organisation
Kosher Nostra is a name given to Jewish-American organized crime

Politics
Audemus jura nostra defendere (Latin "We Dare To Defend Our Rights") is the state motto of Alabama
Provincia Nostra was a name given to Gallia Narbonensis, a Roman province located in what is now Provence

Religion
Nostra aetate is the Declaration on the Relation of the Church with Non-Christian Religions of the Second Vatican Council
Nostra Signora del Santissimo Sacramento e Santi Martiri Canadesi (Our Lady of the Blessed Sacrament and the Canadian Martyrs) is the Roman Catholic national church of Canada, on Via Giovanni Battista de Rossi, Rome
The Sanctuary of Nostra Signora della Misericordia is a church and surrounding buildings located some six kilometers from the center of Savona, Liguria, northern Italy
Nostra Signora delle Grazie is a devotion to the Virgin Mary in the Roman Catholic Church
The Shrine of Nostra Signora della Guardia is a Catholic place of pilgrimage and is located on the top of Mount Figogna
Nostra Signora di Tergu is a parish church in Tergu, province of Sassari, Sardinia, Italy
Nostra Signora del Sacro Cuore is a Catholic church dedicated to the Blessed Virgin Mary located in Rome's Piazza Navona
Nostra Signora di Guadalupe e San Filippo Martire is the national church of Mexico in Rome

Science
Euroleon nostras is an antlion found over most of Europe.

Television
Terra Nostra (telenovela) is a Brazilian telenovela.